Dollocaris is an extinct genus of thylacocephalan that lived during the Jurassic period. Fossils have been found in France, specifically the La Voulte-sur-Rhône lagerstätte. It is known for its massive compound eyes, giving Dollocaris a rather characteristic appearance. One species is currently known, D. ingens.

Description
It sported a row of small appendages to assist in swimming, as well as three pairs of clawed segmented legs, but it was probably a poor swimmer, instead depending on ambush to hunt prey. It is known for its well-preserved, large compound eyes, sporting well-preserved individual retinula cells, which assisted in catching prey.

References

Thylacocephala
Prehistoric crustacean genera
Jurassic crustaceans
Jurassic animals of Europe
Fossil taxa described in 1923